Boris Mikhailovich Teplov (in Tula, Russia – 28 September 1965, in Moscow) was a Russian psychologist who studied problems of inborn individual differences and talents (e.g. musical talents, warlord talents etc.) and a founder of a Soviet psychological school of Differential psychology. His well-known opponent was Aleksey Leontyev who believed that people's talents are not inborn but rather determined by education and other external influence. Boris Teplov was editor-in-chief of the principal Russian journal on psychology Voprosy Psikhologii.

External links
 Temperament and Personality
 Biography 

1896 births
1965 deaths
Russian psychologists
Moscow State University alumni
Academicians of the USSR Academy of Pedagogical Sciences
Academicians of the RSFSR Academy of Pedagogical Sciences
20th-century psychologists